The 2006 Kentucky Wildcats football team represented the University of Kentucky in the 2006 NCAA Division I FBS football season. They participated as members of the Southeastern Conference in the Eastern Division. They played their home games at Commonwealth Stadium in Lexington, Kentucky. The team was coached by Rich Brooks.

Schedule

Commits

Statistics

Team awards
Most Valuable Player: Andre Woodson, QB

Most Outstanding Offensive Player: Keenan Burton, WR

Most Outstanding Defensive Player: Wesley Woodyard, LB

Most Inspirational Player: Michael Aitcheson, OL

Most Improved Players: Dicky Lyons, WR and Durrell White, DL

Outstanding First-Year Players: Alfonso Smith, RB and Trevard Lindley, DB

Special Teams Player of the Year: Jason Dickerson, LS

Most Outstanding Offensive Lineman: Garry Williams, OL

Jerry Claiborne Award (academics/team attitude): Hayden Lane, OL

Most Valuable Scout Team Players: Robbie McAtee, WR and Austin Moss, DT

References

Kentucky
Kentucky Wildcats football seasons
Kentucky Wildcats football